This is a summary of the electoral history of Phil Goff, Mayor of Auckland (2016–present), Leader of the Labour Party (2008–2011). He was a Member of Parliament for three electorates during his career: Roskill, New Lynn and Mount Roskill.

Parliamentary elections

1981 election

1984 election

1987 election

1990 election

1993 election

1996 election

1999 election

2002 election

2005 election

2008 election

2011 election

2014 election

Local elections

2016 Auckland mayoral election

2019 Auckland mayoral election

Notes

References

Goff, Phil